The Minister of Social Affairs was a cabinet position which existed between 17 April 1939 and 1 January 2008. The Ministry of Social Affairs existed alongside the minister after 1 January 1970 when the Cabinet of Iceland Act no. 73/1969 took effect since ministries had not formally existed separately from the ministers. On 1 January 2008 the position became Minister of Social Affairs and Social Security and the ministry itself was also renamed accordingly. On 31 December 2010 the Ministry of Social Affairs and Social Security was merged with the Ministry of Health and Social Security to form the Ministry of Welfare.

List of ministers

Minister of Social Affairs (17 April 1939 – 1 January 2008)

Minister of Social Affairs and Social Security (1 January 2008 – 31 December 2010)

References 

 Social